Colias tamerlana is a butterfly in the family Pieridae. It is found in the eastern Palearctic realm (western Siberia, northern China, and Mongolia).

Description
It is a large and very dark member of the genus Colias.

Biology
The larva feeds on Oxytropis oligantha

Subspecies
C. t. tamerlana Xinjiang, Kirgizia (eastern Issyk Kul)
C. t. mongola Alphéraky, 1897 Altai, Sayan
C. t. sidonia Weiss, 1968 northern Mongolia

Taxonomy
It was accepted as a species by Josef Grieshuber & Gerardo Lamas but may be a subspecies of Colias nastes.

References

Butterflies described in 1897
tamerlana
Butterflies of Asia
Taxa named by Otto Staudinger